Penstemon grandiflorus, the large-flowered beardtongue or large beardtongue, is a perennial flowering plant endemic to the United States. It is sometimes called Penstemon bradburyi.

The Lakota name for this plant is kimi'milia tawana'hca, butterfly flower. The Dakota people are recorded by the ethnographer Dilwyn J. Rogers as using the boiled root for chest pain.

It is considered Endangered in Illinois.

References

grandiflorus
Flora of the United States